Dateline London is a weekly BBC News discussion programme. A panel of four leading journalists, lecturers, and foreign correspondents discussed top news stories from an international perspective. The last episode made was on the 15th October 2022.

Production 
Prior to the COVID-19 pandemic, Dateline London was recorded live on Saturday at 11.30am on the BBC News Channel and BBC World News. It always featured four guests in a round-table discussion of the weeks' main stories.

When the pandemic curtailed all in-person activities, only three guests participated in the programme. Two foreign correspondents from other news agencies or papers joined the programme virtually, with an in-studio guest usually being a relevant BBC correspondent with previous background to the stories being covered. In mid-2022, the virtual guests were stopped as they were accommodated in the studio, and on occasion a BBC correspondent would participate. Additionally, the programme moved to being recorded live every Friday at 7:30 p.m, with repeats continuing as normal over the weekend. If significant news stories occurred during the day, the programme was able to be recorded earlier or later on the Friday.

In mid-2022, at the same time as axing virtual guests, the BBC announced its decision to axe the programme later that year. The final episode was broadcast on 15 October 2022.

Hosts 
Dateline London was first hosted by Charles Wheeler, and subsequently by Gavin Esler. Shaun Ley and Maxine Mawhinney served as stand-in hosts during Esler's tenure.

Esler hosted his final edition on 25 March 2017, and Mawhinney on 8 April 2017. Since 15 April 2017, Dateline London was hosted on rotation by Jane Hill or Shaun Ley, while Carrie Gracie and Tim Willcox provided occasional cover.

Carrie Gracie had presented Dateline London following her return from paid leave in mid-2018. After 33 years with the BBC, Carrie Gracie left in August 2020. Since then, either Shaun Ley or Geeta Guru-Murthy has presented the programme. On 21 May 2021, Martine Croxall presented Dateline London for the first time.

As of October 2021, Shaun Ley was the main presenter of Dateline London. Other presenters occasionally seen hosting the show are Martine Croxall, Ben Brown and Geeta Guru-Murthy.

Regular panelists 

Lyse Doucet chief international correspondent and presenter BBC News 
David Aaronovitch is an Orwell Prize winning journalist
 Yasmin Alibhai-Brown is an Orwell Prize winning journalist
 Mina Al-Oraibi is editor-in-chief at The National
 Abdel Bari Atwan of Rai-al-Youm
 Stephanie Baker of Bloomberg
 Stefanie Bolzen of Die Welt
 Henry Chu of Variety
 Janet Daley of The Daily Telegraph
 Alex Deane is a political commentator
 John Fisher Burns is a Pulitzer Prize winning journalist
 Eunice Goes is a Portuguese writer and lecturer
 Michael Goldfarb is a journalist and author
 Johan Hari is a journalist
 Owen Jones is a journalist, author, and commentator
 Mustapha Karkouti is a freelance journalist
 Gregory Katz of Associated Press
 Thomas Kielinger is a Theodor Wolff Prize winning journalist and the London correspondent for Die Welt
 Jeffrey Kofman is an Emmy Award winning journalist and lecturer
 Laura Lynch is a Canadian writer and broadcaster
 Suzanne Lynch of The Irish Times
 Vincent Magombe is a journalist and analyst
 Nesrine Malik is a Sudanese writer
 Maria Margaronis of The Nation
 Iain Martin is a journalist and author
 Jef McAllister is a journalist and lawyer
 Stryker McGuire of Bloomberg
 Alexander Nekrassov is a Russian journalist
 Brian O'Connell is a journalist and communications advisor
 Annalisa Piras is an Italian writer and film maker
 Agnès Poirier is a journalist, writer, and broadcaster
 Nabila Ramdani is a journalist, writer, and broadcaster
 Steve Richards is a political writer and broadcaster
 Marc Roche of Le Monde
 Jonathan Sacerdoti is a journalist, political commentator and foreign correspondent
 Shahed Sadullah is the former editor of the Pakistani daily The News in London
 Rachel Shabi is a journalist and author
 Ned Temko is a political commentator
 Polly Toynbee is an Orwell Prize winning journalist at The Guardian
 Isabel Hilton, editor of Chinadialogue
 Nazenin Ansari, Iranian exile journalist
 Clive Myrie, BBC News Presenter and foreign correspondent
 Celia Hatton, BBC News Asia Editor and presenter

References 

1996 British television series debuts
2022 British television series endings
2000s British television series
2010s British television series
2020s British television series
BBC television news shows
BBC World News shows